The following notable deaths in the United States occurred in 2022. Names are reported under the date of death, in alphabetical order as set out in WP:NAMESORT.
A typical entry reports information in the following sequence:
Name, age, country of citizenship at birth and subsequent nationality (if applicable), what subject was noted for, year of birth (if known), and reference.

January–June

July–December

References

deaths
2022
+